The women's individual table tennis – Class 7 tournament at the 2016 Summer Paralympics in Rio de Janeiro took place during 8–12 September 2016 at Riocentro Pavilion 3. Classes 6–10 were for athletes with a physical impairment who competed from a standing position; the lower the number, the greater the impact the impairment was on an athlete’s ability to compete.

In the preliminary stage, athletes competed in two groups of four. Winners and runners-up of each group qualified to the semifinals.

Results

Final round

Preliminary rounds
Group A

Group B

References

WI07
Para